Henry Adams (1838–1918), was an American novelist, journalist, and historian.

Henry Adams may also refer to the following people:

 Henry Adams (MP) (by 1532–1611), Welsh politician
 Henry Adams (farmer) (1583–1646), grandfather of U.S. Presidents John Adams and John Quincy Adams
 Henry Adams (shipbuilder) (1713–1805), British shipbuilder
 Henry Adams (pastor) (1802–1872), American Baptist minister
 Henry Adams (Wisconsin politician) (1811–1871), American politician
 Henry Adams (zoologist) (1813–1877), English naturalist
 Henry Adams (Australian politician) (1851–1926), South Australian politician
 Henry Adams (cricketer) (1853–1922), English cricketer
 Henry Adams (mechanical engineer) (1858–1929), American engineer
 Henry Adams (film editor) (1899–1986), American film editor
 Henry Adams (American football) (1915–2005), American football player
 Henry Adams (rower) (born 1980), British competitor at the 2001 World Rowing Championships
 Henry Cadwallader Adams (1817–1899), English cleric and writer of children's novels
 Henry Carter Adams (1851–1921), American economist
 Henry Cullen Adams (1850–1906), American politician
 Henry Foster Adams (1882–1973), American psychologist and writer
 Henry Gardiner Adams (c. 1811–1881), English author and anthologist
 Henry Lee Adams Jr. (born 1945), American lawyer and judge
 Henry Percy Adams (1865–1930), English architect

Henry Adams may refer to the following fictional character:
 Henry Adams, main character in Mark Twain's short story The Million Pound Bank Note

See also
 Henry Adams Building, in Algona, Iowa, United States
 Harry Adams (disambiguation)
 Adams (surname)